Anna Lubomirska is the name of:

 Anna Lubomirska (XVI-); see Stanisław Lubomirski (d. 1585)
 Anna Lubomirska (d. 1736) (17th-century–1736), Polish noble lady
 Anna Lubomirska (d. 1763) (18th-century–1763), member of Polish nobility
 Anna Lubomirska (1882-1947); see Stanisław Albrecht Radziwiłł

See also 
 Anna Krystyna Lubomirska (disambiguation)